80th Street  may refer to:

 80th Street (IND Fulton Street Line), a New York City Subway station in Queens, New York
 80th Street (IRT Second Avenue Line), a former elevated train station in Manhattan, New York
 80th Street (Manhattan)
 80th Street-Eastwick station, a SEPTA trolley station in Philadelphia, Pennsylvania